Marthese Portelli is a Maltese lawyer.

Political career

Portelli was a politician, member of Parliament for District 9, where she was elected in 2013 and re-elected in 2017. She forms part of the Nationalist Party. She also unsuccessfully contested 2009 European Parliament Election in Malta on the Nationalist Party ticket. She was twice elected as the president of the Nationalist Party Executive Committee and was the first woman to hold this role.

References

Living people
Nationalist Party (Malta) politicians
21st-century Maltese lawyers
Year of birth missing (living people)
21st-century Maltese women politicians
21st-century Maltese politicians
Women lawyers
Members of the House of Representatives of Malta